Sir Bernard's Stately Homes is a British TV comedy series first shown in 1999 on BBC Two and later repeated on Play UK.  Only six ten-minute programmes were produced, all written by and starring Matt Lucas and David Walliams.  It bore many similarities to the more well-known Rock Profile. The series was directed by Edgar Wright, and produced by Myfanwy Moore, who would become the producer of Little Britain.

Plot

The central character is Bernard Chumley, played by Matt Lucas, who was already a regular stand-up character of Lucas' and would go on to be a fixture of Little Britain. In each edition, Sir Bernard and his friend Anthony Rogers would investigate a number of country estates while searching for the Golden Potato, an advertising stunt which would win them a year's supply of Allen's Crisps ("the cheaper crisp!")

Each house is named after a character or actor from Grange Hill.  Further popular culture is revisited at the end of episode 5, in which the pair eat snacks on a rollercoaster dressed as scouts, in a similar fashion to a group of scouts in a well-known edition of Jim'll Fix It.  David Foxxe, Paul Putner, Rowland Rivron, Rhys Thomas, and Julie T. Wallace appeared throughout the series. The script editor was Barry Cryer.

Episodes

External links

1999 British television series debuts
1999 British television series endings
BBC television comedy